Saraju District is in Maragheh County, East Azerbaijan province, Iran. At the 2006 National Census, its population was 22,498 in 4,514 households. The following census in 2011 counted 21,371 people in 5,628 households. At the latest census in 2016, the district had 21,631 inhabitants in 6,593 households.

References 

Maragheh County

Districts of East Azerbaijan Province

Populated places in East Azerbaijan Province

Populated places in Maragheh County